Andrew Tampion (born 20 October 1984) is an Australian professional golfer.

Tampion was born in Melbourne, Australia. He turned professional in 2006.

Tampion played on the European Tour in 2007. His best finish of the season came at the Indonesia Open, where he finished tied for second behind Mikko Ilonen in what was just his fourth start of the season. He struggled for the remainder of the season, however, and failed to retain his card.

Tampion spent much of 2008 playing on the Challenge Tour and secured his first professional victory at the Challenge of Ireland.

After finishing fifteenth in the Challenge Tour Rankings the following year, Tampion ensured he would be playing on the European Tour in 2010.

Amateur wins
this list may be incomplete
2004 Master of the Amateurs
2005 HLA Saujana Open Amateur Championship (Malaysia)

Professional wins (2)

Challenge Tour wins (2)

Challenge Tour playoff record (0–1)

Team appearances
Amateur
Nomura Cup (representing Australia): 2005 (winners)
Eisenhower Trophy (representing Australia): 2006
Australian Men's Interstate Teams Matches (representing Victoria): 2002, 2003 (winners), 2004, 2005

See also
2006 European Tour Qualifying School graduates
2009 Challenge Tour graduates

External links

Australian male golfers
PGA Tour of Australasia golfers
European Tour golfers
Golfers from Melbourne
1984 births
Living people